Jamael Anwar Hermitt-Westman (born December 1991)  is a British actor. He is best known for starring as the titular role in the West End production of Lin-Manuel Miranda's musical Hamilton, which earned him a Laurence Olivier Award nomination.

Early life and education
Westman was born in Lambeth, London to football coach Wallace Hermitt and lecturer Susan Westman. He spent the first ten years of his life in Brixton before gentrification pushed his family out to Streatham and later Croydon. His younger brother, Myles, is also an actor. Their parents separated when Westman was a teenager. He is the grandson of football coach Barry Hermitt; Westman's paternal grandparents immigrated to England from Jamaica as part of the Windrush generation. His mother, from Gloucestershire, is of Irish descent.

He attended St Joseph's College in Upper Norwood. He later went on to graduate from the Royal Academy of Dramatic Art (RADA) in 2016.

Career

Theatre
Westman started out in pantomimes and community theatre projects. Before Hamilton, he had only acted in two professional stage productions, The White Devil at Shakespeare's Globe and Torn at the Royal Court.

In June 2017, it was announced Westman was cast as the lead in the West End production of Lin-Manuel Miranda's Hamilton at the Victoria Palace Theatre, a role he has since played both on the West End and on tour. He was due to appear in a new production in Los Angeles of Hamilton from March 12 to November 22, 2020, at the Hollywood Pantages Theatre, but the production was suspended on the date of its intended debut in response to the coronavirus pandemic. The show eventually premiered in Los Angeles on August 17, 2021.

Television and film
Westman made his onscreen debut with a guest role in a 2013 episode of Casualty. He appeared in the films Brand New-U (2015) and Animals (2019). He has also been in several short films, such as Kebab (2014), Wilton (2016), A Poem for Every Autumn Day (2020), and Ice Cream & Doughnuts (2021).

In 2021, he appeared in the Channel 5 miniseries Anne Boleyn as Jane Seymour's ambitious brother, Edward Seymour, 1st Duke of Somerset. He was next cast in the role of Dr George Spencer in the six-part drama The Essex Serpent on Apple TV+, starring Claire Danes and Tom Hiddleston.

Activism 
Westman has been outspoken about racism. In 2019, he said Britain needed to confront its colonial past, and in 2020 he was one of the big names in theatre to sign a letter to industry leaders calling for “urgent reform” to tackle racism and the lack of diversity in the profession.

Filmography

Film

Television

Stage

Awards and nominations
He was nominated for Best Actor at the Laurence Olivier Awards in 2018 for his performance in Hamilton. That same year he was also nominated for the Emerging Talent Award at the Evening Standard Theatre Awards, the oldest theatrical awards ceremony in the United Kingdom, which he won. He was a 2018 Screen International Stars of Tomorrow pick.

References

External links

 

Living people
1992 births
Alumni of RADA
Black British male actors
British male stage actors
English people of Irish descent
English people of Jamaican descent